Thomas Allan Milani (April 13, 1952 – December 28, 2021) was a Canadian-born Italian professional and Olympic ice hockey player.

During the 1976–77 season, Milani played two games in the World Hockey Association with the Minnesota Fighting Saints.

Milani also played for the Italian national team on several occasions including at the A Pool of the 1982 World Ice Hockey Championships and 1983 World Ice Hockey Championships and at the 1984 Olympics.

He died in December 2021, at the age of 69.

Career statistics

Awards and honours

References

External links

1952 births
2021 deaths
Asiago Hockey 1935 players
Bolzano HC players
Brunico SG players
Canadian expatriate ice hockey players in Italy
Canadian ice hockey right wingers
HC Fiemme Cavalese players
HC Merano players
HC Varese players
Ice hockey people from Ontario
Ice hockey players at the 1984 Winter Olympics
Canadian people of Italian descent
Kalamazoo Wings (1974–2000) players
Minnesota Fighting Saints players
Minnesota Duluth Bulldogs men's ice hockey players
Olympic ice hockey players of Italy
Sportspeople from Thunder Bay
Syracuse Blazers players